The General Jose de San Martin Memorial is an equestrian statue memorial of Argentine general and independence leader José de San Martín in Washington, D.C., United States.

The memorial is located at Virginia Avenue and 20th Street N.W. in the Foggy Bottom, Washington, D.C., near the United States Department of State.

The memorial was sculpted by Augustin-Alexandre Dumont beginning in 1924. It is a replica of an original located at the Plaza San Martín in Buenos Aires. The memorial was a gift to the United States from Argentina and was dedicated on October 28, 1925. President Calvin Coolidge spoke at the dedication.
It was rededicated on October 6, 1976.

Plaquette

Next to the memorial is a plaque with the following text:

JOSE de SAN MARTIN
FOUNDER OF THE ARGENTINE INDEPENDENCE
HE LED THE LIBERATING ARMY ACROSS THE ANDES
AND GAVE FREEDOM TO CHILE AND PERU
HIS NAME LIKE WASHINGTON'S REPRESENTS
THE AMERICAN IDEAL OF DEMOCRACY, JUSTICE AND LIBERTY

See also
 List of public art in Washington, D.C., Ward 2
Statues of the Liberators

References

External links
 

1924 sculptures
Monuments and memorials on the National Register of Historic Places in Washington, D.C.
Statues of people of the Spanish American wars of independence
Bronze sculptures in Washington, D.C.
Equestrian statues in Washington, D.C.
Outdoor sculptures in Washington, D.C.
Foggy Bottom
Cultural depictions of José de San Martín